"Quicksand" is a song written by English singer-songwriter David Bowie and released on his 1971 album Hunky Dory.

Background
"Quicksand" was recorded on 14 July 1971 at Trident Studios in London. This ballad features multi-tracked acoustic guitars and a string arrangement by Mick Ronson. Producer Ken Scott, having recently engineered George Harrison's album All Things Must Pass, attempted to create a similarly powerful acoustic sound with this track.

Bowie said of the song "The chain reaction of moving around throughout the bliss and then the calamity of America produced this epic of confusion. Anyway with my esoteric problems I could have written it in Plainview or Dulwich" and that it was a mixture of "narrative and surrealism".

Lyrically the song, like much of Bowie's work at this time, was influenced by Buddhism ("You can tell me all about it on the next Bardo"), occultism, and Friedrich Nietzsche's concept of the Superman. It refers to the magical society Golden Dawn and name-checks one of its most famous members, Aleister Crowley, as well as Heinrich Himmler, Winston Churchill and Juan Pujol (codename: Garbo).

Reception
NME editors Roy Carr and Charles Shaar Murray have described it as "Bowie in his darkest and most metaphysical mood", while a contemporary review in Rolling Stone remarked on its "superb singing" and "beautiful guitar motif from Mick Ronson".

Live performances
Bowie performed the song during his 1997 Earthling Tour. A live recording from one show on 20 July 1997, recorded at Long Marston, England during the Phoenix Festival, was released in a live album entitled Look at the Moon! in February 2021. Bowie performed the song occasionally during his 2003-04 A Reality Tour.

Bowie performed the song at his 50th birthday concert in 1997 along with Robert Smith of The Cure

Other releases
The song was released as the B-side of the single "Rock 'n' Roll Suicide" in April 1974. RCA included the song in the picture disc set Life Time. A studio demo version of the song was released as a bonus track on the Rykodisc release of Hunky Dory in 1990. A November 1996 tour rehearsal recording of the song, which originally aired on a BBC radio broadcast in 1997, was released in 2020 on the album ChangesNowBowie.

Personnel
 David Bowie – lead vocals, acoustic guitar
 Mick Ronson – acoustic guitars, Mellotron, string arrangement
 Trevor Bolder – bass
 Mick Woodmansey – drums
 Rick Wakeman – piano

Notes

References
Pegg, Nicholas, The Complete David Bowie, Reynolds & Hearn Ltd, 2000, 

1970s ballads
1971 songs
David Bowie songs
Folk ballads
Pop ballads
Songs written by David Bowie
Song recordings produced by Ken Scott
Song recordings produced by David Bowie
Songs about criminals